Handcrews are diverse teams of career and temporary wildland firefighters. The crews typically consist of 18 to 20 firefighters but can also contain 4 to 6 and 8 to 10. These crews have the responsibilities of constructing firelines – strips of land cleared of flammable materials and dug down to mineral soil. These lines are generally constructed around wildfires to control them. Another type of line handcrews create is saw line. This is line where all trees limbs are removed up to shoulder height and all small trees and brush is cut down. All the limbs and trees are then carried outside the line and scattered. These are also called ladder fuels that allow the fire to climb up into the canopies which makes controlling a fire much more difficult. Sawyers do the cutting and swampers do the moving of the debris. Depending on the size of the crew there can be between 1 and 5 swampers per sawyer. Other jobs include burn outs, gridding for spot fires, and mop up after the fire is controlled.

Depending on their qualifications and skill levels, crews may be divided into squads (4 or 5 firefighters each). The more qualified crews will have specialized personnel such as sawyers and EMTs. Crews and managers must always monitor the fire and consider safety.  They will often designate one or two crew members to act as a lookout. This person generally has a few years of experience and is placed at a location where they can see a large portion of the fire. For larger fires there are multiple lookouts positioned around the entire fire. They watch for spot fires (fire that crosses the fireline) and take weather readings using a sling psychrometer or a kestrel typically every hour and relaying them up the chain of command. Aircraft can also serve as lookouts at times, but this is not the preferred option.

A crew's day may start at any hour of the day. After breaking fire camp, crews are transported to the fire. Once on location, crews use hand tools (chainsaws, pulaskis, shovels, etc.) for working the fireline. Handcrews may hike several miles or more per day. Once at the fire, they may spend hours constructing firelines.

Some handcrews work on an on-call basis meaning members do not work unless they are specifically called to work. Other handcrews may spend time clearing brush, prescription burning, or doing other chores while waiting for fire assignments.

Types
 Type I Interagency Hotshot Crew
 Type II Initial-Attack (IA) Crew
 Type II Crew
 Type III Crew

See also
 Incarcerated handcrews in California fire camps

References
About Handcrews USFS Retrieved July 11, 2006
 Hotshot Fitness - Hiking, Running, & Strength Training Programs for Wildland Firefighters

Firefighter ranks
Forestry occupations
Wildfire suppression